The St. Louis Cardinals' 2009 season was the 128th season for the franchise in St. Louis, Missouri and the 118th season in the National League. The Cardinals, coming off an 86–76 season and fourth place in the NL Central, got off to a strong start in April before a team-wide offensive breakdown caused them to fall behind the Cubs in the NL Central standings.  Brilliant seasons from starting pitchers Chris Carpenter, Adam Wainwright, and Joel Piñeiro helped St. Louis to stay in contention until the key midseason acquisitions of Matt Holliday, Mark DeRosa, and Julio Lugo revived the Cardinal offense. An August 20–6 effectively ended the NL Central race, and the Cardinals won the division with a 91–71 record, seven-and-a-half games better than the second-place Cubs. However, their playoff run ended quickly when they were swept in three games by the Los Angeles Dodgers in the Division Series.

Offseason departures and acquisitions

Hitters
The Cardinals retained the services of backup catcher Jason LaRue, signing him to another one-year contract.

On December 4, 2008, the Cardinals agreed to a trade with the San Diego Padres sending reliever Mark Worrell and a player-to-be-named-later (the Padres eventually chose minor-league pitcher Luke Gregerson) in exchange for shortstop Khalil Greene, who will make $6.5 mil, and will be eligible for free agency after 2009.  Greene replaced César Izturis, who departed via free agency.

Utility infielder Aaron Miles, a member of the 2006 World Series champion Cardinals, signed a two-year deal on December 31 to play with the Cubs.  Felipe López, who became the starting second baseman after a 2008 deadline trade and hit .385 for the Cardinals in two months, became a free agent and signed with the Diamondbacks.  The third and last second baseman on the 2008 Cardinals, Adam Kennedy, was given his unconditional release on February 9.  With no second baseman with significant big-league experience on the roster, outfielder Skip Schumaker was tabbed to make the unusual transition.  Late in training camp Schumaker was designated the official starting second baseman.

Third baseman Troy Glaus underwent right shoulder surgery on January 21, 2009, and was originally expected to miss Opening Day (April 6) and probably most of April.  Glaus' progress in rehabbing his repaired right shoulder stalled, and he did not return until September (see below).

Pitchers
Kyle Lohse, who went 15–6 with a 3.78 ERA after signing a one-year contract with the 2008 Cardinals, was re-signed to a hefty four-year, $41 mil. contract on September 29, 2008, the day after the season ended.  Mark Mulder's injury-plagued time in St. Louis ended when the Cardinals declined to pick up his $11 mil. option, but instead bought out the remaining year of his contract in 2009 for $1.5 mil.

In December, the Cardinals declined to offer arbitration to relief pitchers Russ Springer and Jason Isringhausen, starter Braden Looper, and relievers Tyler Johnson and Randy Flores.  St. Louis made no attempt to retain lefty reliever Ron Villone, who eventually signed with the Mets. On Dec 3, to fill the lack of left-handed relievers caused by the departure of Flores, Johnson, and Villone, they signed lefty relief specialist Trever Miller to a one-year deal potentially worth $2 million if he reaches all the incentives in the contract.

On January 5, the Cardinals signed lefty reliever Royce Ring who was with the 2008 Atlanta Braves, to a one-year contract.  However, two months later the Cardinals signed Dennys Reyes, a 31-yr.-old left-handed relief specialist, to a two-year deal worth approximately $3 mil.  A few weeks after the acquisition of Reyes, Ring was placed on waivers, eventually accepting an assignment to the minor leagues.

Spring training
St. Louis went 19-12-2 in Grapefruit League play, their most victories since they had 21 wins in 1997. Attendance at RDS was 106,266 in 18 home games (9-7-2) for an average home attendance of 5,901. In 15 road games (10-5-0), attendance 84,499; road average 5,633.

On March 30, relief pitcher Chris Perez was optioned to AAA, finalizing the pitching situation for Opening Day.  Cardinals will carry 12 pitchers, including seven relievers which include long-reliever Brad Thompson.  Rookie Jason Motte appeared to win the closer job, although the Cardinals made no official announcement.

Joe Mather was the final cut in spring training.  Among the players making the Cardinals out of camp were utility infielders Joe Thurston and Brian Barden and two players making their big-league debuts: David Freese, who took the injured Troy Glaus' spot at third base, and former first-round draft pick (and highly anticipated prospect) Colby Rasmus.  Mather's demotion left Ryan Ludwick as the only outfielder on the roster who hits right-handed.

Regular season

April
Opening Day 2009 looked a lot like 2008: a blown save and a bullpen loss.  Rookie closer Jason Motte gave up four runs with two outs in the ninth inning, and the Pirates beat the Cardinals 6–4.

On April 7, the Cardinals beat the Pirates 9-3 as Albert Pujols hit his first home run of the season and reached base five times. As such, Pujols became only the third Cardinals player in the last 55 years to reach base four or more times in each of the first two games of the season. On April 8, the Cardinals lost to the Pirates by a score of 7–4, but Albert Pujols set the franchise record for most assists by a first baseman in a 9-inning game with seven. It was the most assists by a Major League first baseman since the National League record of eight was set in 1971. Pujols also collected his 700th career walk in the game.

On April 9, Chris Carpenter and relievers Franklin and Reyes combined on a one-hitter as the Cardinals beat Pittsburgh 2–1.  It was Carpenter's first victory since Game 3 of the 2006 World Series, October 24.  St. Louis followed up the Pittsburgh series with a three-game sweep over Houston.  In the second game of the Astro series (Apr. 11), Pujols tied a career best with seven RBI as the Cardinals won 11–2; while in the final game Kyle Lohse retired 24 consecutive batters en route to a 3-0 complete game victory.

On April 14, staff ace Chris Carpenter injured his left rib cage while batting.  Early estimates were that he would miss at least a month, and it might be as long as two months. An MRI exam on April 16 revealed an oblique tear on his left side.  On April 17, rookie pitcher P. J. Walters was called up from AAA-Memphis to take Carpenter's spot in the rotation.

On April 20 the Cardinals attempted to buttress a sagging bullpen by trading former Rule 5 draft pick Brian Barton for Atlanta Braves' relief pitcher Blaine Boyer.  Boyer was tabbed to join the big-league club, leaving St. Louis with 13 pitchers on the 25-man roster, with David Freese optioned to Memphis.

On Saturday, April 25, in a nationally televised game on Fox, with the Cardinals leading 3–1 in the seventh inning against the Chicago Cubs, Albert Pujols hit his 8th career grand slam, helping the team win its 5th consecutive game (8-2) and solidifying their lead in the NL Central division. The slam also gave him 1,002 RBIs, making him the 260th player to reach the 1,000-level.

Brendan Ryan went to the 15-day DL with a hamstring strain on April 30, and former first-round draft pick Tyler Greene was called up to be Ryan's replacement. The Cardinals finished the month of April with a 16–7 record, best in baseball.  Albert Pujols was named Player of the Month for April and Brian Barden Rookie of the Month.

May
Center fielder Rick Ankiel ran face-first into the outfield wall while making a catch on May 4.  Three days later, he was placed on the DL (retroactive to May 5), and minor-league outfielder Shane Robinson was called up to take his place on the roster.  On May 12, right fielder Ryan Ludwick joined Ankiel on the DL after straining his right hamstring against the Pirates. The team recalled Nick Stavinoha from its AAA-Memphis team to take Ludwick's spot on the roster.

The injuries to Ankiel and Ludwick, combined with the continuing absence of Carpenter, contributed to a 4-10 stretch that dropped the Cardinals out of first place in the NL Central.  In a showdown series between the Cardinals and Brewers May 16–18, Milwaukee swept St. Louis in St. Louis, winning three games by a combined score of 17–6.  In the opener, Wainwright held the Brewers to two hits in eight innings but still lost, 1–0, on a Corey Hart home run.  In the second game, Cardinal pitchers walked eight batters and hit four; in the third game, they walked eleven and hit one.  Milwaukee took over first place in the Central.

On May 20, Chris Carpenter returned after missing a month with a strained oblique. Carpenter pitched five shutout innings, and the Cards won a pitching duel with the Cubs, 2–1. In his next start Carpenter was perfect for six innings, but St. Louis lost in 10 innings to Milwaukee, 1–0.  Carpenter's ERA remained at 0.00 after his first four appearances.  The two Carpenter starts were part of a nine-game streak for Cardinal pitching in which they held the opposition to three runs or less in every game and did not allow a home run.

On the 29th Ludwick was activated from the DL.  To make room, the Cardinals put Khalil Greene on the DL with "social anxiety disorder".  Greene, signed with the intention of being the everyday shortstop in 2009, played poorly in the field, was hitting .200 at the time he hit the DL, and had been playing less and less frequently in May.  St. Louis went 13–14 in May and finished the month at 29–21, one game behind Milwaukee in the NL Central.  The Cardinals spent the month of May in a horrific team batting slump that saw them post a .299 OBP for the month, dead last in baseball; exceptionally strong pitching in May (3.56 team ERA) helped St. Louis stay close to the top of the NL Central standings.

June
On June 4, the Cardinals released newly acquired pitcher Blaine Boyer and called up Jess Todd to take his place.  One day later, Kyle Lohse, still suffering from the aftereffects of a hit-by-pitch on his throwing forearm, May 23, went to the DL for the first time in his career, and infielder Tyler Greene recalled. The day after that (June 6), pitcher Blake Hawksworth became the 13th rookie to play for the Cardinals in 2009 (a major-league high for any team) and the seventh to make his major-league debut, when he was called up and Jess Todd was sent down.

The continuing team-wide offensive blackout reached its nadir in the second week of June, when the Colorado Rockies, second-worst team in the NL with a 21–32 record prior to the series, came to St. Louis and swept the Cardinals in four games, outscoring the Cardinals 33–9.

Khalil Greene, after three weeks on the disabled list due to anxiety disorder, was activated on June 18.  In his first start since being activated, on June 19, Greene started at third base and hit a home run.  He went on to hit a home run in each of his first three games back, helping the Cardinals to sweep Kansas City in Kansas City and reclaim sole possession of first place in the NL Central.  However, Greene went 0 for his next 16, suffered a relapse of his social anxiety disorder, and went back on the disabled list.

On June 27, in an effort to revive a sputtering offense, the Cardinals acquired Mark DeRosa from Cleveland for Chris Perez and a player to be named later.  DeRosa, who in his career has played every position but pitcher, catcher, and center field, was expected to play third base for St. Louis.  One month later Cleveland selected Jess Todd to complete the deal.

A continuing inability to hit (.310 OBP for June) weighed down the Cardinals for another month: they went 12-17 for June to drop their record for 2009 to 41–38.

July
On July 5, Albert Pujols and Yadier Molina were named as winners of the fan balloting and starters for the National League in the 80th All-Star Game.  Ryan Franklin, 20 for 21 in save opportunities with a 0.84 ERA, was selected to be one of the relief pitchers.  On July 14, St. Louis hosted the All-Star Game for the first time in 43 years.  The AL beat the NL 4–3.  Albert Pujols was 0-for-3 with an error that led to an AL run, Yadier Molina had an RBI single, and Ryan Franklin pitched a scoreless inning.

After appearing in only three games for St. Louis, new addition Mark DeRosa went onto the disabled list (retroactive to July 1) on July 7, suffering from a strained wrist.  However, the rest of the Cardinals, buoyed by Pujols, a hot Colby Rasmus, and a resurgent Ryan Ludwick, went 6–4 on their ten-game road trip before the break, and entered the All-Star break with a 49–42 record and a 2.5 game lead in the NL Central.

The middle of July saw major changes to the Cardinals lineup.  On July 18, Mark DeRosa, suffering from a torn tendon sheath in his wrist that eventually required offseason surgery, was reactivated from the DL and returned to the starting lineup.  Four days later, Chris Duncan, one of the few remaining players from the 2006 world champion Cardinals, was traded to the Boston Red Sox for shortstop Julio Lugo, along with a player-to-be-named-later or cash; and the team recalled Brian Barden.  Two days after that, on July 24, the Cardinals traded three prospects, including their #1 prospect, third baseman Brett Wallace, pitcher Clayton Mortensen, and outfielder Shane Peterson, for Oakland Athletics outfielder Matt Holliday.

On July 28, Todd Wellemeyer was demoted to the bullpen.  Mitchell Boggs was called up from AAA-Memphis to take his July 31 start. At the time of the move, Wellemeyer's 5.79 ERA was second-worst in the National League among players with enough innings to qualify for the ERA title.

Buoyed by the arrival of Holliday and Lugo plus the return of DeRosa to the lineup and a hot Rick Ankiel, the Cardinals won six of their last nine games in July, and went 16-11 for the month. They ended July 1/2 game ahead of the Cubs in the NL Central.  Ryan Ludwick earned honors as the National League Player of the Month for July, after batting
.340 with 6 HR's and a league-high 28 RBI. The Cardinals have had the NL's top player three of the first four months with Albert Pujols winning the award in both April and June.

August
Albert Pujols tied the all-time NL season record set by Ernie Banks in 1955 by hitting his fifth grand slam of the year, (and his second HR of the game) on August 4 at New York. Pujols' slam was the exclamation point in a 12–7, 10-inning victory, in which Pujols went 4-for-5 with five RBIs and three runs scored. The Cardinals previously forced extra innings by rallying for two runs in the ninth off Mets' ace closer Francisco Rodríguez.

After briefly returning to the starting rotation, Todd Wellemeyer went on the DL with elbow inflammation.  Mitchell Boggs was again tabbed to take his place in the rotation.  Later in the month, starting pitcher Kyle Lohse joined him on the DL with a strained groin.

The team came to terms and signed their #1 draft pick, pitcher Shelby Miller, on August 17, just hours before the deadline.

John Smoltz signed with the team on August 19 as a probable fifth starter and also possible reliever after the Red Sox released him. In his first start, against San Diego, Smoltz threw five scoreless innings, striking out nine, and got the win.

The Cardinals played some of their best baseball of the season in the middle of August.  Consecutive series victories against Pittsburgh, Cincinnati, San Diego, and Los Angeles, plus a win in the first game of another series with San Diego, pushed St. Louis to 17 games over .500 at 70–53, the furthest over .500 the franchise had reached since the 2005 team went 100–62.  St. Louis opened up a six-game lead over the second-place Cubs during this stretch.

A 7–0 victory from Chris Carpenter, giving him an NL-tying 14th win, over San Diego at Petco Park on August 22, was the unofficial 10,000th win in franchise history. The official total (9,219) is lower because the Cardinals franchise does not count its ten years in the American Association in its all-time statistics.

On August 28, Albert Pujols hit his eighth career walk-off home run in John Smoltz's first home game at Busch Stadium in a 3–2 win over Washington.

A sweep of the Nationals ended one of the best Augusts in franchise history.  The Cardinals went 20-6 for the month, pushing their overall record to 22 games over .500 at 77–55, and opening up a ten-game lead over the Cubs.  They did not lose a series all month.  Albert Pujols had a 1.092 OPS for the month while Matt Holliday, whose acquisition at the end of July coincided with the sudden takeoff of the Cardinals, posted a .963 OPS for August.  Aces Adam Wainwright and Chris Carpenter had ERAs of 1.30 and 2.20 for August.  Closer Ryan Franklin did not allow a run all month.  Wainwright's 2–1 win over the Nationals on August 30 made him MLB's first 16-game winner.  Carpenter was named the NL's Pitcher of the Month for August.

September/October
Third baseman Troy Glaus, out all year with a shoulder injury, became the first September call-up after maximum roster size expanded to 40.  Adam Wainwright was touched for six runs in five innings by the Pirates but still earned his league-leading 17th victory on September 4. Albert Pujols hit only his second career pinch-hit home run in the 10th for a dramatic 2–1 game-winner over the Pirates, at PNC Park, September 5.

Chris Carpenter threw a one-hitter on September 7 against the Brewers at Miller Park, striking out 10, earning his first shutout since September 11, 2006, and reaching 1,300 career strikeouts.

A three-game sweep by the Braves September 11–13 marked the first time St. Louis had lost a series since July 24–26 against Philadelphia, and the first time the Cardinals lost the opening game of a series since July 20 against Houston.

After the Memphis Redbirds' season ended with a loss in the AAA National Championship Game, the Cardinals announced four more September call-ups: David Freese, Tyler Greene, Josh Kinney, and Matt Pagnozzi.  Pagnozzi, nephew to former Cardinals All-Star catcher Tom Pagnozzi, first appeared in a game on September 29, becoming the tenth player to make his big-league debut with the 2009 Cardinals.  The other nine rookies were Freese, Greene, P. J. Walters, Shane Robinson, Jarrett Hoffpauir, Colby Rasmus, Blake Hawksworth, Clayton Mortensen, and Jess Todd.

The Cardinals finally clinched the NL Central championship at Colorado (September 26), with their 90th win, 6–3, on a tie-breaking home run by replacement catcher Jason LaRue in the 7th inning.
Ryan Ludwick later added a pinch-hit 2-run home run in the 9th inning. Adam Wainwright got his NL-leading 19th win, going 8 innings with 130 pitches, giving up 10 hits, walking one, and striking out 11. It was the Cardinals' seventh NL division championship in the last ten seasons, and eighth for manager Tony La Russa in 14 seasons as Cardinal manager, although one championship was a shared one with Houston in 2001.

On October 1, Chris Carpenter threw five shutout innings in a 13–0 victory over Cincinnati.  Carpenter finished his season with a 17–4 record.  He lowered his ERA to 2.24, securing his first ERA title and the first ERA title for any Cardinal since Joe Magrane was National League ERA champion in 1988. Carpenter also hit the first home run of his big league career, a grand slam, and drove in six runs to double his career RBI total.

In that same game Carpenter pitched (Oct 1, 2009), Tony La Russa passed John McGraw for second-most games managed in baseball with his 4,770th game managed (2,552-2,214-4). La Russa gets three more games (October 4) to extend his managed games to 4,773 (2,552-2,217-4) by the end of the 2009 season.

The next night, a bullpen collapse robbed Adam Wainwright of his chance to be the only 20-game winner in baseball, but Wainwright still finished as the National League leader in wins, with a 19–8 record and a 2.63 ERA.

The Cardinals finished the 2009 season losing 8 of their last 10 and 14 of their last 21 to go 91-71 for the year. Albert Pujols won his first home run title with 47, despite not homering after September 9. He also broke the all-time single-season record for assists by a first baseman with his record 185th in the last game.

On October 5, Chris Carpenter was named NL Comeback Player of the Year (second time) for his superb season, after leading the NL with a 2.24 ERA and an .810 winning percentage (17-4).

Postseason

Division Series

In the 2009 National League Division Series, St. Louis faced off against the Los Angeles Dodgers, NL West champions.  The Cardinals went 5–2 against the Dodgers in the regular season, and were the favorites in the National League, but the Dodgers swept the Cardinals in three games to bring St. Louis' 2009 season to a quick end.  It was only the second time in eight trips to the postseason that a LaRussa-led Cardinals team lost in the first round.

Awards
Adam Wainwright and Yadier Molina won Gold Gloves, the first for Wainwright and second for Molina.  Albert Pujols won the Silver Slugger Award as the best hitting first baseman in the NL, and the Hank Aaron Award as the best hitter in the National League.  In a close race, Wainwright finished third in voting (90 pts.) for the Cy Young Award despite getting the most first place votes (12). Chris Carpenter finished second (94 pts.), six points behind winner Tim Lincecum.  Albert Pujols won his second consecutive Most Valuable Player award, winning all 32 first place votes.

Season standings

Game log
Regular Season Schedule (calendar style)     
Regular Season Schedule (sortable text)   Downloadable Schedule for Microsoft Outlook, Palm (PDA) 
National Broadcast Schedule     
All game times are in Central Time Zone.

|- align="center" bgcolor="ffbbbb"
| 1 || April 6 || Pirates || 6–4 || Grabow (1–0) || Motte (0–1) || Capps (1) || 45,832 || 0–1
|- align="center" bgcolor="bbffbb"
| 2 || April 7 || Pirates || 9–3 || Lohse (1–0) || Snell (0–1) || || 35,206 || 1–1
|- align="center" bgcolor="ffbbbb"
| 3 || April 8 || Pirates || 7–4 || Duke (1–0) || Wellemeyer (0–1) || Capps (2) || 35,535 || 1–2
|- align="center" bgcolor="bbffbb"
| 4 || April 9 || Pirates || 2–1 || Carpenter (1–0) || Ohlendorf (0–1) || Reyes (1) || 35,293 || 2–2
|- align="center" bgcolor="bbffbb"
| 5 || April 10 || Astros || 5–3 || Piñeiro (1–0) || Hampton (0–1) || McClellan (1) || 37,224 || 3–2
|- align="center" bgcolor="bbffbb"
| 6 || April 11 || Astros || 11–2 || Wainwright (1–0) || Oswalt (0–2) || || 43,454 || 4–2
|- align="center" bgcolor="bbffbb"
| 7 || April 12 || Astros || 3–0 || Lohse (2–0) || Rodríguez (0–1) || || 36,310 || 5–2
|- align="center" bgcolor="bbffbb"
| 8 || April 13 || @ Diamondbacks || 2–1 || Wellemeyer (1–1) || Davis (0–2) || Franklin (1) || 25,014 || 6–2
|- align="center" bgcolor="ffbbbb"
| 9 || April 14 || @ Diamondbacks || 7–6 (10) || Peña (2–0) || Thompson (0–1) || || 25,678 || 6–3
|- align="center" bgcolor="bbffbb"
| 10 || April 15 || @ Diamondbacks || 12–7 || Piñeiro (2–0) || Garland (1–1) || || 21,298 || 7–3
|- align="center" bgcolor="bbffbb"
| 11 || April 16 || @ Cubs || 7–4 || Wainwright (2–0) || Patton (0–1) || Franklin (2) || 38,909 || 8–3
|- align="center" bgcolor="ffbbbb"
| 12 || April 17 || @ Cubs || 8–7 || Heilman (2–0) || Pérez (0–1) || Mármol (2) || 40,250 || 8–4
|- align="center" bgcolor="ffbbbb"
| 13 || April 18 || @ Cubs || 7–5 (11) || Guzmán (1–0) || Reyes (0–1) || || 40,878 || 8–5
|- align="center" bgcolor="bbbbbb"
| || April 19 || @ Cubs || colspan=6 |Postponed
|- align="center" bgcolor="bbffbb"
| 14 || April 21 || Mets || 6–4 || Motte (1–1) || Putz (1–1) || Franklin (3) || 35,506 || 9–5
|- align="center" bgcolor="bbffbb"
| 15 || April 22 || Mets || 5–2 || Piñeiro (3–0) || Maine (0–2) || Franklin (4) || 35,622 || 10–5
|- align="center" bgcolor="bbffbb"
| 16 || April 23 || Mets || 12–8 || Lohse (3–0) || Hernández (1–1) || || 38,522 || 11–5
|- align="center" bgcolor="bbffbb"
| 17 || April 24 || Cubs || 4–3 || McClellan (1–0) || Mármol (0–1) || Franklin (5) || 45,812 || 12–5
|- align="center" bgcolor="bbffbb"
| 18 || April 25 || Cubs || 8–2 || Boggs (1–0) || Marshall (0–1) || || 46,707 || 13–5
|- align="center" bgcolor="ffbbbb"
| 19 || April 26 || Cubs || 10–3 || Harden (2–1) || Wellemeyer (1–2) || || 44,742 || 13–6
|- align="center" bgcolor="bbffbb"
| 20 || April 27 || @ Braves || 3–2 || Piñeiro (4–0) || Jurrjens (2–2) || Franklin (6) || 16,739 || 14–6
|- align="center" bgcolor="ffbbbb"
| 21 || April 28 || @ Braves || 2–1 || Moylan (1–1) || McClellan (1–1) || González (3) || 18,121 || 14–7
|- align="center" bgcolor="bbffbb"
| 22 || April 29 || @ Braves || 5–3 || Wainwright (3–0) || Vázquez (2–2) || Franklin (7) || 19,127 || 15–7
|- align="center" bgcolor="bbffbb"
| 23 || April 30 || @ Nationals || 9–4 || Pérez (1–1) || Tavárez (0–2) || || 18,007 || 16–7
|-

|- align="center" bgcolor="bbffbb"
| 24 || May 1 || @ Nationals || 6–2 || Wellemeyer (2–2) || Zimmermann (2–1) || || 20,697 || 17–7
|- align="center" bgcolor="ffbbbb"
| 25 || May 2 || @ Nationals || 6–1 || Martis (3–0) || Piñeiro (4–1) || || 19,950 || 17–8
|- align="center" bgcolor="bbbbbb"
| || May 3 || @ Nationals || colspan=6 |Postponed
|- align="center" bgcolor="ffbbbb"
| 26 || May 4 || Phillies || 6–1 || Blanton (1–2) || Lohse (3–1) || || 35,990 || 17–9
|- align="center" bgcolor="ffbbbb"
| 27 || May 5 || Phillies || 10–7 || Myers (2–2) || Wainwright (3–1) || || 36,754 || 17–10
|- align="center" bgcolor="bbffbb"
| 28 || May 6 || Pirates || 4–2 || McClellan (2–1) || Duke (3–3) || Franklin (8) || 36,188 || 18–10
|- align="center" bgcolor="bbffbb"
| 29 || May 7 || Pirates || 5–2 || Wellemeyer (3–2) || Ohlendorf (3–3) || Franklin (9) || 41,928 || 19–10
|- align="center" bgcolor="ffbbbb"
| 30 || May 8 || @ Reds || 6–4 || Cueto (3–1) || Piñeiro (4–2) || Cordero (9) || 18,016 || 19–11
|- align="center" bgcolor="ffbbbb"
| 31 || May 9 || @ Reds || 8–3 || Harang (3–3) || Lohse (3–2) || || 40,651 || 19–12
|- align="center" bgcolor="bbffbb"
| 32 || May 10 || @ Reds || 8–7 (10) || Franklin (1–0) || Cordero (0–2) || Pérez (1) || 27,664 || 20–12
|- align="center" bgcolor="ffbbbb"
| 33 || May 12 || @ Pirates || 7–1 || Duke (4–3) || Wellemeyer (3–3) || || 11,718 || 20–13
|- align="center" bgcolor="ffbbbb"
| 34 || May 13 || @ Pirates || 5–2 || Ohlendorf (4–3) || Piñeiro (4–3) || Capps (6) || 10,494 || 20–14
|- align="center" bgcolor="bbffbb"
| 35 || May 14 || @ Pirates || 5–1 || Miller (1–0) || Karstens (1–2) || || 12,347 || 21–14
|- align="center" bgcolor="bbbbbb"
| || May 15 || Brewers || colspan=6 |Postponed
|- align="center" bgcolor="ffbbbb"
| 36 || May 16 || Brewers || 1–0 || Suppan (3–3) || Wainwright (3–2) || Hoffman (9) || 43,382 || 21–15
|- align="center" bgcolor="ffbbbb"
| 37 || May 17 || Brewers || 8–2 || Parra (3–4) || Wellemeyer (3–4) || || 43,042 || 21–16
|- align="center" bgcolor="ffbbbb"
| 38 || May 18 || Brewers || 8–4 || Looper (4–2) || Lohse (3–3) || || 39,136 || 21–17
|- align="center" bgcolor="bbffbb"
| 39 || May 19 || Cubs || 3–0 || Piñeiro (5–3) || Lilly (5–3) || || 41,374 || 22–17
|- align="center" bgcolor="bbffbb"
| 40 || May 20 || Cubs || 2–1 || Carpenter (2–0) || Dempster (3–3) || Franklin (10) || 41,703 || 23–17
|- align="center" bgcolor="bbffbb"
| 41 || May 21 || Cubs || 3–1 || Wainwright (4–2) || Marshall (2–3) || Franklin (11) || 44,235 || 24–17
|- align="center" bgcolor="bbffbb"
| 42 || May 22 || Royals || 5–0 || Wellemeyer (4–4) || Davies (2–3) || || 43,429 || 25–17
|- align="center" bgcolor="bbffbb"
| 43 || May 23 || Royals || 5–0 || Lohse (4–3) || Hochevar (0–2) || || 43,829 || 26–17
|- align="center" bgcolor="ffbbbb"
| 44 || May 24 || Royals || 3–2 || Bannister (4–1) || Piñeiro (5–4) || Cruz (2) || 44,213 || 26–18
|- align="center" bgcolor="ffbbbb"
| 45 || May 25 || @ Brewers || 1–0 (10) || Villanueva (2–3) || McClellan (2–2) || || 43,032 || 26–19
|- align="center" bgcolor="bbffbb"
| 46 || May 26 || @ Brewers || 8–1 || Wainwright (5–2) || Suppan (3–4) || || 37,404 || 27–19
|- align="center" bgcolor="bbffbb"
| 47 || May 27 || @ Brewers || 3–2 || Wellemeyer (5–4) || Parra (3–6) || Franklin (12) || 40,226 || 28–19
|- align="center" bgcolor="ffbbbb"
| 48 || May 29 || @ Giants || 4–2 || Cain (6–1) || Piñeiro (5–5) || Wilson (11) || 35,266 || 28–20
|- align="center" bgcolor="bbffbb"
| 49 || May 30 || @ Giants || 6–2 || Carpenter (3–0) || Zito (1–6) || || 35,592 || 29–20
|- align="center" bgcolor="ffbbbb"
| 50 || May 31 || @ Giants || 5–3 || Valdéz (2–0) || Wainwright (5–3) || Wilson (12) || 41,440 || 29–21
|-

|- align="center" bgcolor="ffbbbb"
| 51 || June 1 || Reds || 5–3 || Lincoln (1–0) || Wellemeyer (5–5) || Cordero (14) || 35,815 || 29–22
|- align="center" bgcolor="bbffbb"
| 52 || June 2 || Reds || 5–2 || Motte (2–1) || Arroyo (7–4) || Franklin (13) || 35,507 || 30–22
|- align="center" bgcolor="ffbbbb"
| 53 || June 3 || Reds || 9–3 || Cueto (5–3) || Lohse (4–4) || || 35,811 || 30–23
|- align="center" bgcolor="bbffbb"
| 54 || June 4 || Reds || 3–1 || Carpenter (4–0) || Harang (5–6) || || 39,249 || 31–23
|- align="center" bgcolor="ffbbbb"
| 55 || June 5 || Rockies || 11–4 || de la Rosa (1–6) || Wainwright (5–4) || || 41,115 || 31–24
|- align="center" bgcolor="ffbbbb"
| 56 || June 6 || Rockies || 10–1 || Cook (4–3) || Wellemeyer (5–6) || || 44,002 || 31–25
|- align="center" bgcolor="ffbbbb"
| 57 || June 7 || Rockies || 7–2 || Jiménez (4–6) || Piñeiro (5–6) || || 42,288 || 31–26
|- align="center" bgcolor="ffbbbb"
| 58 || June 8 || Rockies || 5–2 || Marquis (8–4) || Thompson (0–2) || Street (9) || 36,748 || 31–27
|- align="center" bgcolor="ffbbbb"
| 59 || June 9 || @ Marlins || 4–3 || Lindstrom (2–1) || Motte (2–2) || || 13,103 || 31–28
|- align="center" bgcolor="bbffbb"
| 60 || June 10 || @ Marlins || 13–4 || Wainwright (6–4) || Volstad (4–6) || || 14,624 || 32–28
|- align="center" bgcolor="bbffbb"
| 61 || June 11 || @ Marlins || 6–5 || Miller (2–0) || Núñez (2–3) || Franklin (14) || 19,112 || 33–28
|- align="center" bgcolor="ffbbbb"
| 62 || June 12 || @ Indians || 7–3 || Huff (2–2) || Piñeiro (5–7) || || 28,159 || 33–29
|- align="center" bgcolor="bbffbb"
| 63 || June 13 || @ Indians || 3–1 || Thompson (1–2) || Ohka (0–1) || Franklin (15) || 31,754 || 34–29
|- align="center" bgcolor="ffbbbb"
| 64 || June 14 || @ Indians || 3–0 || Lee (4–6) || Carpenter (4–1) || || 23,644 || 34–30
|- align="center" bgcolor="bbffbb"
| 65 || June 16 || Tigers || 11–2 || Wainwright (7–4) || Verlander (7–3) || || 44,021 || 35–30
|- align="center" bgcolor="bbffbb"
| 66 || June 17 || Tigers || 4–3 || Wellemeyer (6–6) || Jackson (6–4) || Franklin (16) || 39,699 || 36–30
|- align="center" bgcolor="ffbbbb"
| 67 || June 18 || Tigers || 6 – 3 || Porcello (8-4) || Piñeiro (5-8) || Rodney (13) || 41,323 || 36-31 
|- align="center" bgcolor="bbffbb"
| 68 || June 19 || @ Royals || 10 – 5 || Thompson (2-2) || Davies (3-7) || || 37,660 || 37-31 
|- align="center" bgcolor="bbffbb"
| 69 || June 20 || @ Royals (Fox) || 7 – 1 || Carpenter (5-1) || Bannister (5-4) || Franklin (17)|| 38,769 || 38-31
|- align="center" bgcolor="bbffbb"
| 70 || June 21 || @ Royals || 12 – 5 || Wainwright (8-4) || Meche (4-6) || || 33,805 || 39-31
|- align="center" bgcolor="ffbbbb"
| 71 || June 22 || @ Mets || 6 – 4 || Redding (1-2) || Wellemeyer (6-7) || Rodríguez (19) || 38,488 || 39-32 
|- align="center" bgcolor="bbffbb"
| 72 || June 23 || @ Mets || 3 – 0 || Piñeiro (6-8) || Hernández (5-2) || || 38,903 || 40-32 
|- align="center" bgcolor="ffbbbb"
| 73 || June 24 || @ Mets || 11 – 0 || Nieve (3-0) || Thompson (2-3) || || 39,689 || 40-33 
|- align="center" bgcolor="ffbbbb"
| 74 || June 25 || @ Mets || 3 – 2 || Santana (9-5) || Carpenter (5-2) || Rodríguez (20) || 41,221 || 40-34 
|- align="center" bgcolor="ffbbbb"
| 75 || June 26 || Twins || 3 – 1 || Perkins (3-4) || Wainwright (8-5) || Nathan (18) || 44,159 || 40-35 
|- align="center" bgcolor="bbffbb"
| 76 || June 27 || Twins || 5 – 3 || Kinney (1-0) || Slowey (10-3) || Franklin (18) || 42,986 || 41-35
|- align="center" bgcolor="ffbbbb"
| 77 || June 28 || Twins || 6 – 2 || Liriano (4-8) || Piñeiro (6-9) || Nathan (19) || 42,705 || 41-36 
|- align="center" bgcolor="ffbbbb"
| 78 || June 29 || Giants || 10 – 0 || Lincecum (8-2) || Thompson (2-4) || || 37,737 || 41-37
|- align="center" bgcolor="ffbbbb"
| 79 || June 30 || Giants || 6 – 3 || Johnson (8-5) || Carpenter (5-3) || Wilson (21) || 37,174 || 41-38 
|-

|- align="center" bgcolor="bbffbb"
| 80 || July 1 || Giants || 2 – 1 (10 inn.) || Franklin (2-0) || Howry (0-4) || || 36,928 || 42-38 
|- align="center" bgcolor="bbffbb"
| 81 || July 2 || Giants || 5 – 2 || Wellemeyer (7-7) || Zito (4-8) || Franklin (19) || 41,875 || 43-38 
|- align="center" bgcolor="bbffbb"
| 82 || July 3 || @ Reds || 7 – 4 || Motte (3-2) || Herrera (1-4) || Franklin (20) || 41,349 || 44-38 
|- align="center" bgcolor="ffbbbb"
| 83 || July 4 || @ Reds || 5 – 2 || Owings (6-8) || Thompson (2-5) || Cordero (20) || 37,371 || 44-39 
|- align="center" bgcolor="bbffbb"
| 84 || July 5 || @ Reds || 10 – 1  || Carpenter (6-3) || Arroyo (8-8) || || 24,017 || 45-39 
|- align="center" bgcolor="bbffbb"
| 85 || July 7 || @ Brewers || 5 – 0 || Wainwright (9-5) || Gallardo (8-6) || || 36,557 || 46-39
|- align="center" bgcolor="ffbbbb"
| 86 || July 8 || @ Brewers  || 5 – 4 || Coffey (4-1) || Motte (3-3) || Hoffman (19) || 33,655 || 46-40 
|- align="center" bgcolor="bbffbb"
| 87 || July 9 || @ Brewers || 5 – 1 || Piñeiro (7-9) || Villanueva (2-5) || || 40,357 || 47-40 
|- align="center" bgcolor="bbffbb"
| 88 || July 10 || @ Cubs || 8 – 3 || Carpenter (7-3) || Harden (5-6) || || 40,687 || 48-40 
|- align="center" bgcolor="ffbbbb"
| 89 || July 11 || @ Cubs (Fox) || 5 – 2 || Lilly (9-6) || Thompson (2-6)  || || 41,210 || 48-41 
|- align="center" bgcolor="ffbbbb"
| 90 || July 12 || @ Cubs || 7 – 3 || Zambrano (5-4) || Lohse (4-5) || || 40,701 || 48-42 
|- align="center" bgcolor="bbffbb"
| 91 || July 12 || @ Cubs (ESPN Sunday Night Baseball) || 4 – 2 || Wainwright (10-5)  || Wells (4-4) || Franklin (21) || 41,244 || 49-42 
|- align="center" bgcolor="bbbbbb"  
| -- || July 14 || All-Star Game 7:00pm (Fox) ||colspan=6|American League 4,   National League 3   (St. Louis, Missouri   Busch Stadium)
|- align="center" bgcolor="bbffbb"  
| 92 || July 17 || Diamondbacks || 6 – 1 || Carpenter (8-3) || Garland (5-9) || || 44,781 || 50-42 
|- align="center" bgcolor="ffbbbb"
| 93 || July 18 || Diamondbacks || 4 – 2 || Haren (10-5) || Wainwright (10-6) || Qualls (17) || 45,267 || 50-43 
|- align="center" bgcolor="bbffbb"
| 94 || July 19 || Diamondbacks || 2 – 1 || Piñeiro (8-9) || Petit (0-4) || Franklin (22) || 41,759 || 51-43 
|- align="center" bgcolor="ffbbbb"
| 95 || July 20 || @ Astros || 3 – 2 || Moehler (7-5) || Lohse (4-6) || Valverde (10) || 36,437 || 51-44 
|- align="center" bgcolor="ffbbbb"
| 96 || July 21 || @ Astros || 11 – 6 || Rodríguez (10-6) || Wellemeyer (7-8) || || 33,140 || 51-45 
|- align="center" bgcolor="ffbbbb"
| 97 || July 22 || @ Astros || 4 – 3 || Valverde (1-2) || Franklin (2-1) || || 37,619 || 51-46 
|- align="center" bgcolor="bbffbb"
| 98 || July 23 || @ Nationals || 4 – 1 (6 inn.) || Wainwright (11-6) || Balester (0-1) || || 25,359 || 52-46 
|- align="center" bgcolor="bbffbb"
| 99 || July 24 || @ Phillies || 8 – 1 || Piñeiro (9-9) || Happ (7-1) || || 45,166 || 53-46 
|- align="center" bgcolor="ffbbbb"
| 100 || July 25 || @ Phillies (Fox) || 14 – 6 || Lopez (3-0) || Motte (3-4) || || 45,182  || 53-47 
|- align="center" bgcolor="ffbbbb"
| 101 || July 26 || @ Phillies (TBS) || 9 – 2 || Blanton (7-4) || Wellemeyer (7-9) || || 45,271 || 53-48
|- align="center" bgcolor="bbffbb"
| 102 || July 27 || Dodgers (ESPN) || 6 – 1 || Carpenter (9-3) || Wolf (5-5) || Franklin (23) || 43,756 || 54-48 
|- align="center" bgcolor="bbffbb"
| 103 || July 28 || Dodgers || 10 – 0 || Wainwright (12-6)  || Billingsley (10-6) || || 40,105 || 55-48 
|- align="center" bgcolor="bbffbb"
| 104 || July 29 || Dodgers || 3 – 2 (15 inn.) || Hawksworth (1-0) || Weaver (5-4) || || 40,011 || 56-48 
|- align="center" bgcolor="ffbbbb"
| 105 || July 30 || Dodgers || 5 – 3 (10 inn.) || McDonald (3-2) || Reyes (0-2) || Broxton (24) || 43,263 || 56-49 
|- align="center" bgcolor="bbffbb"
| 106 || July 31 || Astros || 4 – 3  || Miller (3-0) || Arias (2-1) || Franklin (24) || 43,760 || 57-49 
|-

|- align="center" bgcolor="bbffbb"
| 107 || August 1 || Astros || 3 – 1 || Carpenter (10-3) || Fulchino (4-4) || || 45,074 || 58-49 
|- align="center" bgcolor="ffbbbb"
| 108 || August 2 || Astros || 2 – 0 || Norris (1-0) || Wainwright (12-7) || Valverde (12) || 45,227 || 58-50 
|- align="center" bgcolor="bbffbb"
| 109 || August 4 || @ Mets || 12 – 7 (10 inn.) || McClellan (3-2) || Feliciano (4-4) || || 40,354 || 59-50 
|- align="center" bgcolor="ffbbbb"
| 110 || August 5 || @ Mets || 9 – 0 || Figueroa (1-2) || Lohse (4-7) || Parnell (1) || 39,781 || 59-51 
|- align="center" bgcolor="bbffbb"
| 111 || August 7 || @ Pirates || 6 – 4 || Carpenter (11-3) || Ascanio (0-2) || Franklin (25) || 24,854 || 60-51
|- align="center" bgcolor="bbffbb"
| 112 || August 8 || @ Pirates || 5 – 3 || Wainwright (13-7)  || Morton (2-5) || Franklin (26) || 38,593 || 61-51 
|- align="center" bgcolor="bbffbb"
| 113 || August 9 || @ Pirates || 7 – 3 || Piñeiro (10-9) || Capps (2-7) || McClellan (2) || 24,369 || 62-51 
|- align="center" bgcolor="bbffbb"
| 114 || August 10 || Reds || 4 – 1 || Lohse (5-7) || Wells (0-3) || Franklin (27) || 40,212 || 63-51 
|- align="center" bgcolor="ffbbbb"
| 115 || August 11 || Reds || 5 – 4 || Lehr (2-0) || Boggs (1-1) || Cordero (25) || 40,145 || 63-52
|- align="center" bgcolor="bbffbb"
| 116 || August 12 || Reds || 5 – 2 || Carpenter (12-3) || Bailey (2-4) || Franklin (28) || 40,328 || 64-52 
|- align="center" bgcolor="bbffbb"
| 117 || August 14 || Padres || 9 – 2 || Wainwright (14-7) || Latos (4-2) || || 42,208 || 65-52
|- align="center" bgcolor="bbffbb"
| 118 || August 15 || Padres || 7 – 4 || Piñeiro (11-9) || Stauffer (1-5) || Franklin (29) || 44,292 || 66-52 
|- align="center" bgcolor="bbffbb"
| 119 || August 16 || Padres || 7 – 5 || Miller (4-0) || Bell (4-2) || || 40,812 || 67-52  
|- align="center" bgcolor="bbffbb"
| 120 || August 17 || @ Dodgers || 3 – 2 || Carpenter (13-3) || Haeger (0-1) || Franklin (30) || 49,415 || 68-52 
|- align="center" bgcolor="ffbbbb"
| 121 || August 18 || @ Dodgers || 7 – 3 || Billingsley (12-6)  || Boggs (1-2) || Broxton (26) || 49,052 || 68-53 
|- align="center" bgcolor="bbffbb"
| 122 || August 19 || @ Dodgers || 3 – 2 || McClellan (4-2) || Broxton (7-1) || Franklin (31) || 54,847 || 69-53 
|- align="center" bgcolor="bbffbb"
| 123 || August 20 || @ Padres || 5 – 1 || Piñeiro (12-9) || Stauffer (1-6) || || 19,867 || 70-53 
|- align="center" bgcolor="ffbbbb"
| 124 || August 21 || @ Padres || 4 – 0 || Richard (7-3) || Lohse (5-8) || || 27,282 || 70-54 
|- align="center" bgcolor="bbffbb"
| 125 || August 22 || @ Padres || 7 – 0 || Carpenter (14-3) || Correia (8-10) || || 38,156 || 71-54 
|- align="center" bgcolor="bbffbb"
| 126 || August 23 || @ Padres || 5 – 2 || Smoltz (3-5)   [1st GS, 1-0] || Carrillo (1-2) || Franklin (32) || 27,435 || 72-54 
|- align="center" bgcolor="bbffbb"
| 127 || August 25 || Astros || 1 – 0 || Wainwright (15-7) || Rodríguez (12-8) || Franklin (33) || 40,512 || 73-54 
|- align="center" bgcolor="bbffbb"
| 128 || August 26 || Astros || 3 – 2 || Piñeiro (13-9) || Oswalt (7-5) || Franklin (34) || 40,311 || 74-54 
|- align="center" bgcolor="ffbbbb"
| 129 || August 27 || Astros || 4 – 3 || Valverde (2-2) || McClellan (4-3) || || 40,348 || 74-55 
|- align="center" bgcolor="bbffbb"
| 130 || August 28 || Nationals || 3 – 2 || Motte (4-4) || Bergmann (2-4) || || 40,033 || 75-55 
|- align="center" bgcolor="bbffbb"
| 131 || August 29 || Nationals || 9 – 4 || Boggs (2-2) || Stammen (4-7) || || 44,028 || 76-55 
|- align="center" bgcolor="bbffbb"
| 132 || August 30 || Nationals || 2 – 1 || Wainwright (16-7) || Mock (3-6) || Franklin (35) || 41,083 || 77-55 
|-

|- align="center" bgcolor="bbffbb"
| 133 || September 1 || Brewers || 7-6 || Piñeiro (14-9) || Weathers (3-5) || Franklin (36) || 40,119 || 78-55 
|- align="center" bgcolor="bbffbb"
| 134 || September 2 || Brewers || 10 – 3 || Carpenter (15-3)  || Bush (3-6) || || 40,214 || 79-55 
|- align="center" bgcolor="ffbbbb"
| 135 || September 3 || Brewers || 4 – 3 || Parra (10-10)  || Smoltz (3-6) || Hoffman (30) || 37,791 || 79-56
|- align="center" bgcolor="bbffbb"
| 136 || September 4 || @ Pirates || 14 – 7 || Wainwright (17-7) || Hart (4-5) || || 15,258 || 80-56 
|- align="center" bgcolor="bbffbb"
| 137 || September 5 || @ Pirates || 2 – 1 (10) || Hawksworth (2-0) || Capps (3-8) || Franklin (37) || 27,071 || 81-56 
|- align="center" bgcolor="ffbbbb"
| 138 || September 6 || @ Pirates || 6 – 5 || Chavez (1-4) || Franklin (2-2) || || 19,274 || 81-57 
|- align="center" bgcolor="bbffbb"
| 139 || September 7 || @ Brewers || 3 – 0 || Carpenter (16-3) || Bush (3-7) || || 35,360 || 82-57 
|- align="center" bgcolor="bbffbb"
| 140 || September 8 || @ Brewers || 4 – 3 || Hawksworth (3-0) || Hoffman (1-2) || McClellan (3) || 36,172 || 83-57 
|- align="center" bgcolor="bbffbb"
| 141 || September 9 || @ Brewers || 5 – 1 || Wainwright (18-7) || Suppan (6-9) || || 26,559 || 84-57 
|- align="center" bgcolor="ffbbbb"
| 142 || September 11 || Braves || 1 – 0 || Jurrjens (11-10) || Piñeiro (14-10) || Soriano (23) || 43,984 || 84-58 
|- align="center" bgcolor="ffbbbb"
| 143 || September 12 || Braves (Fox) || 7 – 6 || Gonzalez (4-4) || Franklin (2-3) || Soriano (24) || 43,869 || 84-59 
|- align="center" bgcolor="ffbbbb"
| 144 || September 13 || Braves || 9 – 2 || Vázquez (13-9) || Carpenter (16-4) || || 41,179 || 84-60 
|- align="center" bgcolor="bbffbb"
| 145 || September 14 || Marlins || 11 – 6 || Hawksworth (4-0) || Nolasco (11-9) || || 43,582 || 85-60 
|- align="center" bgcolor="ffbbbb"
| 146 || September 15 || Marlins || 2 – 1 || West (7-5) || Wainwright (18-8) || Núñez (21) || 42,895 || 85-61 
|- align="center" bgcolor="ffbbbb"
| 147 || September 16 || Marlins || 5 – 2 || Johnson (15-4) || Piñeiro (14-11) || Núñez (22) || 43,020 || 85-62 
|- align="center" bgcolor="bbffbb"
| 148 || September 18 || Cubs || 3 – 2 || Franklin (3-3) || Heilman (3-4) || || 45,959 || 86-62 
|- align="center" bgcolor="bbffbb"
| 149 || September 19 || Cubs (Fox) || 2 – 1 || Franklin (4-3) || Mármol (2-4) || || 46,506 || 87-62 
|- align="center" bgcolor="ffbbbb"
| 150 || September 20 || Cubs (ESPN) || 6 – 3 (11) || Caridad (1-0) || Boggs (2-3) || Mármol (14) || 44,937 || 87-63
|- align="center" bgcolor="bbffbb"
| 151 || September 21 || @ Astros || 7 – 3 || Lohse (6-8) || Rodríguez (13-11) || || 34,705 || 88-63 
|- align="center" bgcolor="bbffbb"
| 152 || September 22 || @ Astros || 11 – 2 || Piñeiro (15-11) || Bazardo (0-2) || || 32,644 || 89-63
|- align="center" bgcolor="ffbbbb"
| 153 || September 23 || @ Astros || 3 – 0 || Norris (6-3) || Smoltz (3-7) || Valverde (24) || 38,732  || 89-64 
|- align="center" bgcolor="ffbbbb"
| 154 || September 25 || @ Rockies || 2 – 1 || Street (4-1)  || Miller (4-1) || || 48,847 || 89-65 
|- align="center" bgcolor="bbffbb"
| 155 || September 26 || @ Rockies || 6 – 3 || Wainwright (19-8) || Jiménez (14-12) || Franklin (38) || 47,741 || 90-65 
|- align="center" bgcolor="ffbbbb"
| 156 || September 27 || @ Rockies || 4 – 3 || de la Rosa (16-9) ||  Lohse (6-9) || Street (34) || 42,032 || 90-66 
|- align="center" bgcolor="ffbbbb"
| 157 || September 29 || @ Reds || 7 – 2 || Bailey (7-5) || Piñeiro (15-12) || || 12,026 || 90-67 
|- align="center" bgcolor="ffbbbb"
| 158 || September 30 || @ Reds || 6 – 1 || Arroyo (15-13) || Smoltz (3-8) || || 11,930 || 90-68 
|-

|- align="center" bgcolor="bbffbb"
| 159 || October 1 || @ Reds || 13 – 0 || Carpenter (17-4) || Wells (2-5) || || 11,861 || 91-68
|- align="center" bgcolor="ffbbbb"
| 160 || October 2 || Brewers || 12 – 6 || Looper (14-7) || McClellan (4-4) || || 44,331 || 91-69 
|- align="center" bgcolor="ffbbbb"
| 161 || October 3 || Brewers || 5 – 4 || Villanueva (4-10)|| Lohse (6-10) || Hoffman (37) || 43,977 || 91-70 
|- align="center" bgcolor="ffbbbb"
| 162 || October 4 || Brewers || 9 – 7 (10) || Hoffman (3-2) || Wellemeyer (7-10) || Axford (1) || 43,464 || 91-71
|-

Record vs. opponents

Roster

Players

Player stats

Batting
Note: G = Games played; AB = At bats; R = Runs; H = Hits; 2B= Doubles; 3B = Triples; HR = Home runs; RBI = Runs batted in; BB = Walks;  Avg. = Batting average; OBP = On-base percentage; SLG = Slugging percentage

(through October 4)

2009 St. Louis Cardinals batting stats at Baseball Reference

2009 St. Louis Cardinals hitting stats at Baseball Almanac

 
Note: Pitchers batting stats included (at least one at-bat).

^ Traded to or away from Cardinals dates

BOLD = Leading NL

Pitchers

Note: G = Games pitched; GS = Games started; SV = Saves; IP = Innings pitched; W = Wins; L = Losses; ERA = Earned run average; H = Hits allowed; HR = Home runs allowed; BB = Walks allowed, SO = Strikeouts; WHIP = (Walks + Hits) per innings pitched; HBP = Hit by pitch; BF = Batters faced 

(FINAL through October 4)

2009 St. Louis Cardinals pitching stats at Baseball Reference

2009 St.Louis Cardinals pitching stats at Baseball Almanac

Bold = leading NL

Relief pitchers

(FINAL through October 4)

22–17, 3.61 ERA, 1.32 WHIP, 432.0 IP, 379 H, 193 R, 173 ER, 42 HR, 191 BB, 335 SO

(FINAL through October 4)

Saves / Opp: 43/58 (74%)   1st Batter / Retired: 338/474 (71%) 
Holds: 86          Inherited Runners / Scored: 56/242 (23%)

Blown Saves by bullpen: 17   Franklin (5), McClellan (4), Perez (1), Kinney (1), Miller (2), Motte (4) 
Games lost by bullpen:   16

Scoring by inning
(FINAL through October 4)

Cardinals Record When
(FINAL through October 4)

Home   46-35 
Away   45-36

Scoring first       71-25 
Opp. scores first 20-46

Scoring more than 3 runs    66-19 
      Scoring 3 runs             17-17 
Scoring fewer than 3 runs      8-35 

Leading after 7 innings       72-5  
      Tied after 7 innings        9-7 
Trailing after 7 innings         9-59 

Leading after 8 innings     79-3  
      Tied after 8 innings     7-9  
Trailing after 8 innings      4-59  

Blown Saves by bullpen: 17 (Franklin (5), McClellan (4), (Perez [1], Kinney [1], (Miller [2], Motte [4]) 
Games lost by bullpen:   16

In errorless games   56-33 
Extra innings             5-6 
Shutouts                   11-10

One-run games       24-21

Out-hit opponents           62-12  
Same hits as opponents 13-5  
Out-hit by opponents     16-54 

Runs via HR         249 
Opp. Runs via HR  213

By Day

Mon.  8-9 
Tue. 14-11 
Wed. 15-10 
Thu. 14-5 
Fri.   15-10 
Sat.  15-11 
Sun.  10-15

By Opponent 
DIVISION 
                HOME ROAD  TOTAL

NL Central    24-16   22-18    46-34 
NL East        7-7     10-9    17-16 
NL West     10-8       9-7   19-15 
AL Central      5-4      4-2      9-6

TOTALS     46-35   45-36    91-71 
(Interleague  9-6)

Busch Stadium (Indexes)
(FINAL through October 4)

2009   (100 = Neutral Park, > 100 Ballpark favors, < 100 Ballpark inhibits 
  81 HOME G; Cardinals: 2,654 AB;   Opponents: 2,790 AB) 
  81 AWAY G: Cardinals: 2,811 AB;   Opponents: 2,670 AB)

R  92  
H  98  
HR  74  

(Cardinals batting: HOME .263    ROAD .263    OVERALL .263) 
(Opponents batting: at StL .254   on ROAD .261   OVERALL  .258)

2007–2009 Index (3-yr. composite)

HOME 243 G; Cardinals: 8,089 AB;   Opponents: 8,503 AB)

BA 100  
R  93  
H  99  
2B 93  
3B 90  
HR 80  
BB 99  
SO 95  
E 107  
E-inf. 108  
LHB-BA 101  
LHB-HR 82  
RHB-BA 99  
RHB-HR 78

Draft picks
St. Louis' picks at the 2009 Major League Baseball draft at MLB Network Studios, New York City on June 9 – 11, 2009.

For the entire draft, the Cardinals selection breakdown was as follows: 29 pitchers
(21-RHP, 8-LHP), 11 infielders, six catchers and four outfielders. The Cardinals
second-round pick, Robert Stock out of USC, will begin his pro career as a catcher
and that is reflected in these numbers. St. Louis selected 43 college players and
seven high school prospects.

bold = agreed to terms

Farm system

LEAGUE CHAMPIONS: Memphis

Draft selections
St. Louis Cardinals 2009 Draft Selections

References

External links 
St. Louis Cardinals 2009 season at Baseball Reference
St. Louis Cardinals Roster at Baseball Almanac
St. Louis Cardinals TEAM AUDIT at Baseball Prospectus
St. Louis Cardinals Team Page at Scout.com

St. Louis Cardinals seasons
St. Louis Cardinals
National League Central champion seasons
St Louis